Killick may refer to:

 Killick or Admiral Killick, a coast guard and navy base of Haiti
 Killick hitch, a type of hitch knot
 Killick, a slang term for Leading Seaman
 The Killick: A Newfoundland Story, by Geoff Butler, a GG-nominated piece of literature, see 1995 Governor General's Awards
 A type of small anchor

People with the name of "Killick"
 Killick (name)
 Hammerton Killick, an admiral in the Haitian Navy